Stelios Grant Pavlou (born 22 November 1970) is a British screenwriter and speculative fiction novelist. He is known for writing the novel Decipher and the screenplay for the film The 51st State.

Personal life
Pavlou was born in Kent, England on 22 November 1970 and went to the Chatham Grammar School for Boys. He attended the University of Liverpool in American Studies and received a degree in American Studies, which required that he spend a semester in the United States. Pavlou also served in the Cypriot army for one year.

Career 
After graduating from the University of Liverpool Pavlou applied to approximately 600 media jobs, but with no success. He wrote the script for the film The 51st State (known as Formula 51 in the US) while he was living in Rochester, Kent and working for a local wine shop. The film was released in 2001 and starred Samuel L. Jackson and Robert Carlyle. For the British DVD release Pavlou did the audio commentary and included a featurette titled, "Who the Hell is Stel Pavlou." During 2001 Pavlou also published his debut novel, Decipher, through Simon & Schuster. The novel centers upon Atlantis and received reviews from The Independent, The Washington Post, and Cryptologia. He published a second novel, Gene, in 2005 and in 2017, released the first book in his children's fiction series Daniel Coldstar.

In 2021, Pavlou hosted a television show on the Discovery Channel titled "Hunting Atlantis," which has been criticised by professional archaeologists for pseudoscience and contributing to false perceptions of history and archaeology.

Selected works
Novels
 2001 Decipher and related website Atlantipedia
 2005 Gene
 2017 Daniel Coldstar: The Relic War
 2019 Daniel Coldstar: The Betrayer

Short stories
 2006 "Checkpoint", published in Doctor Who Short Trips: The Centenarian
2007 "Omegamorphosis", published in Short Trips: Destination Prague
2007 "You Had Me at Verify User Name and Password", published in Short Trips: Snapshots
Screenplays
 2002 Screenplay for The 51st State / Formula 51 (including the DVD extra Who the hell is Stel Pavlou?)

References

External links

 Official website
 

1970 births
Living people
Alumni of Liverpool Hope University
English people of Greek Cypriot descent
21st-century British novelists
British male screenwriters
People from Gillingham, Kent
British male novelists
21st-century British male writers
21st-century British screenwriters